Kvaček or Kvacek is a Czech surname and can refer to:

 , Czech botanist
 Karel Kváček (1912–1986), Czech wrestler
 , Czech researcher, Institute of Ore Research, Kutna Hora
 Milouš Kvaček (1933–2010), Czechoslovak professional football player
  (b. 1932), Czech historian
  (1937-2020), Czech palaeobotanist